Duílio Dias Júnior or simply Duílio (born 13 March 1957, in Curitiba) is a Brazilian retired footballer who played as a midfielder, and the current manager.

Career statistics
(Correct )

Honours

Player
Coritiba
 Campeonato Paranaense: 1976, 1978, 1979

America
 Torneio dos Campeões: 1982

Fluminense
 Campeonato Carioca: 1983, 1984
 Campeonato Brasileiro Série A: 1984

Estrela Amadora
 Taça de Portugal: 1989–90

Manager
 Qadsia SC
 Kuwaiti Premier League: 2003–04, 2004–05
 Kuwait Emir Cup: 2005–06

 Rio Branco
 Campeonato Capixaba: 2015

References

1957 births
Footballers from Curitiba
Brazilian footballers
Brazilian football managers
Association football midfielders
Expatriate footballers in Portugal
Expatriate football managers in Kuwait
Brazilian expatriate sportspeople in Kuwait
Expatriate football managers in Kazakhstan
Brazilian expatriate sportspeople in Kazakhstan
Campeonato Brasileiro Série A players
Campeonato Brasileiro Série B players
Campeonato Brasileiro Série A managers
Campeonato Brasileiro Série B managers
Campeonato Brasileiro Série D managers
Coritiba Foot Ball Club players
Associação Portuguesa de Desportos players
America Football Club (RJ) players
Fluminense FC players
Sporting CP footballers
C.F. Estrela da Amadora players
A.D. Ovarense players
Portimonense S.C. players
Mesquita Futebol Clube managers
Qadsia SC managers
Serrano Football Club managers
Nova Iguaçu Futebol Clube managers
Rio Branco Atlético Clube managers
America Football Club (RJ) managers
Bonsucesso Futebol Clube managers
Americano Futebol Clube managers
Audax Rio de Janeiro Esporte Clube managers
Living people
Kuwait Premier League managers